"All Caps" is a single by the hip-hop duo Madvillain released in February 2004 ahead of their debut studio album Madvillainy. Though "All Caps" is the A-side, the official title of the single is "Curls & All Caps".

Background
"All Caps" is a reference to MF DOOM's preference that his stage name be written in all capital letters. An early version of this song appeared on the Madvillainy Demo Tape which originally leaked to the internet in early 2003. Around 200 copies of a promotional 12" single were pressed and released to radio stations and DJs including the bonus track "Bonus Beat (Radio Promo Version)". Approximately 40 to 50 of these were hand-painted by Madvillainy cover designer Jeff Jank.

Music video
The video for "All Caps", directed and animated by James Reitano for TFU Studios, is in the form of an animated Silver Age comic book. It begins with two scientists in a lab experimenting with chemicals. Their work goes awry when a mixture fills the lab with gas, and the scientists, locked in by a supposed security guard, begin to mutate. One grows into a huge man-monster called "Madvillain" and dons an MF DOOM mask while the other shrinks into a purple alien-like creature with telepathic powers. He is encased in a golden casket-like case, and they both manage to escape the lab. The "title page" then appears, along with a seal bearing Stan Lee's and Jack Kirby's names, and Madvillain, now wearing a suit with a green trenchcoat and brown hat, carries the golden case until he is confronted by a gang of men in suits called "The Minions of Death." They seem to be after the golden case, but the man-monster doesn't surrender it without a fight. Using a laser rifle, the Minions manage to capture the golden case and subdue Madvillain. Back at their hideout, the Minions demand Madvillain to open the case by force. The alien scientist awakens, and the man-monster hears his thoughts, giving him a boost of energy to let them both escape the hideout. The video ends with a high-speed chase in the mountains with the Minions pursuing the mutated scientists. After they fire a few shots, the alien tells the man-monster to speed up. In a cliffhanger ending, the last "page" reads, "Will Madvillain Survive the Minions of Death? Check Back Next Time, Pilgrims!"

Between each scene, there are parodies of typical ads found in comic books, such as sea monkeys for sale and faux job offers. There is also a mail-in section of the comic called "Mail (to the) Villain," where Madlib and MF DOOM make a cameo appearance.

The creature featured in the video was reproduced by Kidrobot as a vinyl figure in a green trenchcoat along with a limited edition featuring a grey trenchcoat.

Track listing

Radio Promo Version

Personnel
Credits are adapted from the single's liner notes.

Personnel
 DOOM – MC
 Madlib – beats

Additional personnel
 Peanut Butter Wolf – executive production
 Dave Cooley – recording, mastering

Artwork
 Eric Coleman – photo
 Jank – cover

In popular culture
 "All Caps" is featured in The Boondocks episode "Let's Nab Oprah" during a fight scene between Huey and Bushido Brown.

Notes

References

External links
Stones Throw - Madvillain

2004 singles
2004 songs
Madlib songs
Song recordings produced by Madlib